Neolithocolletis mayumbe is a moth of the family Gracillariidae. It is ony known from the Democratic Republic of Congo where it inhabits West African primary forest.

The forewings are elongate and the ground colour is shiny golden, with indistinct fasciate whitish markings, intermixing with the ground colour of the forewing and dark beige scales. The hindwings are silvery shiny greyish white. Adults have been recorded on wing in late March.

Etymology
The name refers to the type locality, the Mayumbe Forest.

References

Moths described in 2012
Lithocolletinae
Insects of the Democratic Republic of the Congo
Moths of Africa
Endemic fauna of the Democratic Republic of the Congo

Taxa named by Jurate de Prins